U.S. Customhouse is a historic customhouse located at Oswego in Oswego County, New York.  It is a three-story, flat roofed, rectangular stone building flanked by identical two-story wings.  The original structure was built in 1858 and the wings added in 1935.  It was designed by architect Ammi B. Young (1798–1874).

It was listed on the National Register of Historic Places in 1976.

References

Government buildings on the National Register of Historic Places in New York (state)
Government buildings completed in 1858
Buildings and structures in Oswego County, New York
Custom houses in the United States
Ammi B. Young buildings
Oswego, New York
National Register of Historic Places in Oswego County, New York
Custom houses on the National Register of Historic Places